A list of American films released in 1957. The Bridge on the River Kwai won the Academy Award for Best Picture.

A-B

C-H

I-N

O-Q

R-T

U-Z

See also
 1957 in the United States

References

External links

 1957 films at the Internet Movie Database

1957
Films
Lists of 1957 films by country or language